Hilton Princess San Salvador Hotel is a hotel in San Salvador, El Salvador. Designed by Salvadoran architect Manuel Roberto Meléndez Bischitz, it is one of the tallest buildings in the country at 61 metres. The lobby has a marble floor and large paintings and the rooms are said to have thick carpets with heavy wood armoires.

References

External links
Official site

Hotels in El Salvador
Buildings and structures in San Salvador
Princess San Salvador
Hotels established in 1997
Hotel buildings completed in 1997